The Rural Municipality of Glenside No. 377 is a rural municipality (RM) in the Canadian province of Saskatchewan within Census Division No. 12 and  Division No. 6.

History 
The RM of Glenside No. 377 incorporated as a rural municipality on December 13, 1909.

Geography

Communities and localities 
The following unincorporated communities are within the RM.

Localities
 Baljennie
 Spinney Hill

Demographics 

Attractions 
 Glenburn Regional Park

Government 
The RM of Glenside No. 377 is governed by an elected municipal council and an appointed administrator that meets on the second Wednesday of every month. The reeve of the RM is Elmer Dove while its administrator is Joanne Fullerton. The RM's office is located in Biggar.

Transportation 
 Saskatchewan Highway 4
 Saskatchewan Highway 784

See also 
List of rural municipalities in Saskatchewan

References 

G